The German Autumn was a series of events in Germany in 1977, mostly late in the year, associated with the kidnapping and murder of industrialist, businessman, and former SS member Hanns Martin Schleyer, president of the Confederation of German Employers' Associations (BDA), and the Federation of German Industries (BDI), by the Red Army Faction (RAF), a far-left militant organisation, and the hijacking of Lufthansa Flight 181 (known in Germany by the aircraft's name Landshut) by the Popular Front for the Liberation of Palestine (PFLP). They demanded the release of ten RAF members detained at the Stammheim Prison plus two Palestinian compatriots held in Turkey and US$15 million in exchange for the hostages. The assassination on 7 April 1977 of Siegfried Buback, the attorney-general of West Germany, and the failed kidnapping and murder of the banker Jürgen Ponto on 30 July 1977, marked the beginning of the German Autumn. It ended on 18 October, with the liberation of the Landshut, the deaths of the leading figures of the first generation of the RAF in their prison cells, and the death of Schleyer.

The phrase "German Autumn" is derived from the 1978 film  (Germany in Autumn), a German omnibus film whose segments covered the social atmosphere during late 1977, while offering different critical perspectives and arguments pertaining to the situation. The directors involved were Heinrich Böll, Hans Peter Cloos, Rainer Werner Fassbinder, Alexander Kluge, Maxmiliane Mainka, Edgar Reitz, Katja Rupé, Volker Schlöndorff, Peter Schubert and Bernhard Sinkel. Kluge and Beate Mainka-Jellinghaus edited the film.

Events

Murder of Siegfried Buback

On 7 April 1977, Siegfried Buback, the attorney-general of West Germany, was shot and killed alongside his driver Wolfgang Göbel and a passenger, judicial officer Georg Wurster, in an ambush whilst travelling from his home in Neureut to the Bundesgerichtshof in Karlsruhe.

Four RAF members, Christian Klar, Knut Folkerts, Günter Sonnenberg and Brigitte Mohnhaupt were formally charged and prosecuted in connection with the Buback murder. In 2007, former RAF members Peter-Jürgen Boock and Verena Becker claimed that another former RAF member, Stefan Wisniewski, had fired the gun that killed Buback.

Kidnapping and murder of Jürgen Ponto

On 30 July 1977, Jürgen Ponto, the head of Dresdner Bank, was shot and killed in his house in Oberursel in a kidnapping that went wrong. Those involved were Brigitte Mohnhaupt, Christian Klar and Susanne Albrecht, the last being the sister of Ponto's goddaughter.

Kidnapping and murder of Hanns Martin Schleyer

On 5 September 1977, an RAF 'commando unit' attacked the chauffeured car carrying Hanns Martin Schleyer, then-president of the German employers' association, in Cologne. His driver, Heinz Marcisz, 41, was forced to brake when a baby carriage suddenly appeared in the street in front of them. The police escort vehicle behind them was unable to stop in time, and crashed into Schleyer's car. Four (or possibly five) masked RAF members sprayed machine gun and machine pistol bullets into the two vehicles, killing Marcisz and a police officer, Roland Pieler, 20, who was seated in the backseat of Marcisz's car. The driver of the police escort vehicle, Reinhold Brändle, 41, and a third police officer, Helmut Ulmer, 24, who was in the second vehicle, were also killed. The hail of bullets riddled over twenty bullet wounds into the bodies of Brändle and Pieler. Schleyer was abducted and held prisoner in a rented apartment in an anonymous residential neighborhood near Cologne. He was forced to appeal to the center-left West German government under Helmut Schmidt for the 'first generation' of RAF members (then imprisoned) to be exchanged for him. Police attempts to locate Schleyer proved unsuccessful. On 18 October 1977, three of the imprisoned RAF members were found dead in their cells. In response, Schleyer was taken from Brussels and shot dead en route to Mulhouse, France, where his body was left in the trunk of a green Audi 100 on the rue Charles Péguy. After the kidnappers phoned the location of the Audi to the Deutsche Presse-Agentur office in Stuttgart, Schleyer's body was recovered on 19 October.

Landshut hijacking

When it became clear that the government was unwilling to entertain a further prisoner exchange given the experience of the kidnapping of Peter Lorenz two years earlier, the RAF tried to exert additional pressure by hijacking Lufthansa Flight 181 on 13 October 1977 with the help of the allied Popular Front for the Liberation of Palestine (PFLP). After a long odyssey through the Arabian Peninsula and the execution-type killing of Captain Jürgen Schumann, the hijackers and their hostages landed in Mogadishu, the capital of Somalia.

After political negotiations with Somali leader Siad Barre, the West German government was granted permission to assault Lufthansa 181. This was carried out on 18 October by the special task force GSG 9, which had been formed after the 1972 Munich Olympics hostage crisis. Only one GSG 9 member and one flight attendant were injured; of the hijackers, only Souhaila Andrawes survived.

On the same night, three of the imprisoned RAF members – Gudrun Ensslin, Jan-Carl Raspe and Andreas Baader – were found dead in their cells.

The official investigation into the deaths of the imprisoned RAF members concluded that they had committed suicide: Baader and Raspe using handguns allegedly smuggled into the Stammheim maximum security prison by their lawyer Arndt Müller, Ensslin by hanging herself. Irmgard Möller, who was imprisoned with them, survived with four knife wounds in her chest. She later claimed that the "suicides" were actually extrajudicial killings. On 12 November 1977, Ingrid Schubert was found hanged in her cell.

Reactions

Political divides
Germany's political parties also came into fierce clashes during the German Autumn. The coalition, accused the opposition of hysteric overreactions and seizing the opportunity to transform the Federal Republic a little way into a police state.

Policy agreements
The Schmidt administration convened the Großer Krisenstab (Great Crisis Committee), an informal council formed at the beginning of the Schleyer kidnapping, which involved members of all parties in the Bundestag and several Minister Presidents of German states. Historian Wolfgang Kraushaar likened its 45-day rule to an "undeclared state of emergency". One result of the cross-party collaboration was the Kontaktsperre, a law which mandated that RAF prisoners could have no access to newspapers, TV, or radio, and could not be visited by family or lawyers.

References

Citations

Sources
 
  Originally published as

External links 
1977: the German Autumn Chronology of the main events, statements by the RAF

1977 crimes in Germany
1977 in West Germany
Cold War conflicts
Conflicts in 1977
Hostage taking in Germany
Red Army Faction
Terrorist incidents in Europe in 1977
Terrorist incidents in Germany in 1977